Wade Hampton High School is a public high school in Greenville, South Carolina, United States. The school primarily serves the communities of Wade Hampton and Taylors, South Carolina. The school was opened in the fall of 1960, consolidating former high schools Paris Mountain and Taylors and some students who formerly attended
Greenville Senior High School. The original buildings were torn down and the new building campus re-opened in January 2006 on the same site.

Namesake 
Wade Hampton High School takes its name from Wade Hampton III who was one of the largest slave owners in the country, and went on to serve in the confederate army and as the governor of South Carolina. He later was elected as a U.S. Senator from the state. His campaign as governor was marked by extensive violence by the Red Shirts, a paramilitary group that served the Democratic Party by disrupting elections and suppressing black and Republican voting in the state. They contributed to the Democrats regaining control of the state government in this period.

The name has garnered mild controversy in the community, but so far there is no real push to get the name changed, despite efforts from students and other members of the community.

The school was opened in the fall of 1960, a time when it was not uncommon to name schools after confederate generals and other historical figures, that would deter African American attendance at their schools.

Academics 
Wade Hampton consistently scores higher than both the national and state averages on tests such as the SAT, ACT, and EOC. The school's campus is also home to The Fine Arts Center of Greenville.

Athletics 

The 1968 football team finished with a 10–1 record and met the Greenwood High School Emeralds for the first South Carolina state 4A championship, resulting in a loss. The Sandlappers defeated the North Carolina team 21–7. The boys basketball team won state championships in 1970, 1972 and 2011.  The boys cross-county team won state championships in 1999, 2000, 2001, 2002, and 2003.

Notable alumni

 Jim DeMint – former member U.S House of Representatives, former U. S. Senator
 Clyde Mayes – 1974 & 1975 Southern Conference Men's Basketball Player of the Year, former NBA basketball player
 John Michael McConnell – retired Vice admiral (United States) Navy, former Director of the National Security Agency 
 Jane Robelot – television news personality
 John Piper -  is a bible scholar, Baptist theologian, pastor, and chancellor of Bethlehem College & Seminary in Minneapolis, Minnesota. Piper founded Desiring God Ministries, with the aim of "spread[ing] a passion for the supremacy of God in all things for the joy of all peoples through Jesus Christ".

References

Additional references
 Ackerman, Robert K. Wade Hampton III. Columbia: University of South Carolina Press, 2007. .
 Eicher, John H., and David J. Eicher, Civil War High Commands. Stanford: Stanford University Press, 2001. .
 Jarrell, Hampton M. Wade Hampton and the Negro: The Road Not Taken. Columbia: University of South Carolina Press, 1969. .
 Andrew, Rod, Jr. Wade Hampton: Confederate Warrior to Southern Redeemer (2008)
 Shrine Bowl of the Carolinas 
 Sifakis, Stewart. Who Was Who in the Civil War. New York: Facts On File, 1988. .
 Tagg, Larry. The Generals of Gettysburg, Campbell, CA: Savas Publishing, 1998. .
 Warner, Ezra J. Generals in Gray: Lives of the Confederate Commanders. Baton Rouge: Louisiana State University Press, 1959. .
 Wells, Edward L. Hampton and Reconstruction. Columbia, SC: The State Co., 1907. .

External list 
 

Public high schools in South Carolina
1960 establishments in South Carolina
Schools in Greenville County, South Carolina
Educational institutions established in 1960